Perkins is an English surname. 

Perkins may also refer to:

Places

In the United States
 Perkins, Georgia, an unincorporated community
 Perkins, Indiana, an unincorporated community
 Perkins, Iowa, an unincorporated community
 Perkins, Michigan, an unincorporated community
 Perkins, Minnesota, an unincorporated community
 Perkins, Missouri, an unincorporated community
 Perkins, Oklahoma, a city
 Perkins, West Virginia, an unincorporated community
 Perkins County, Nebraska
 Perkins County, South Dakota
 Perkins Township, Erie County, Ohio
 Perkins Township, Maine

Elsewhere
 Mount Perkins, Marie Byrd Land, Antarctica
 Perkins Glacier, Marie Byrd Land, Antarctica
 Perkin's Pillar, British Columbia, Canada

People
 Perkins Bass (1912-2011), four-time U.S. congressman from New Hampshire
 Perkins King (1784-1857), U.S. congressman from New York

Entertainment 
Quinn Perkins, fictional character on Scandal

Companies and brands
 Perkins Engines, a manufacturer of industrial diesel engines established in Peterborough, UK
 Perkins Restaurant and Bakery, a North American restaurant chain
 Perkins Paste, an Australian brand of adhesive

Schools
 Perkins School for the Blind, Watertown, Massachusetts
 Perkins School of Theology, Southern Methodist University, Texas

Buildings
 Perkins Building, Tacoma, Washington
 Perkins Buildings, Providence, Rhode Island
 Perkins Center for the Arts, serving southern New Jersey
 Perkins House (disambiguation)
 Perkins Manor (Contoocook, New Hampshire)
 Perkins Observatory, an astronomical observatory in Delaware, Ohio
 Perkins Opera House, Monticello, Florida
 Perkins Square Gazebo, Baltimore, Maryland
 Perkins Stadium, Whitewater, Wisconsin, used primarily for football
 Perkins Stone Mansion, Akron, Ohio
 Perkins Tide Mill, Kennebunkport, Maine

Other uses
 , three US Navy destroyers
 Camp Perkins, a former Massachusetts Army National Guard camp
 Carl D. Perkins Vocational and Technical Education Act, legislation supporting career and technical education in the U.S.
 Federal Perkins Loan, a need-based type of American student loan
 Illinois v. Perkins, a US Supreme Court case—see Miranda warning#Exemption for interrogations conducted by undercover agents
 Perkins Arboretum, Colby College, Waterville, Maine
 Perkins Brailler, a machine used to write braille
 Perkins Engineering, a racing team in the Australian V8 Supercar Championship Series from 1986 to 2008
 Perkins Estate, Brookline, Massachusetts
 Perkins Field, a public airport near Overton, Nevada

See also
 Perkin (disambiguation)